Lakhnauti, also known as Gauḍa, is an ancient ruined city in West Bengal, India.

Lakhnauti may refer to:
 Lakhnauti Turk, a village in Uttar Pradesh, India
 Lakhnauti, a Bengal kingdom ruled by Shamsuddin Firoz Shah and then Ghiyasuddin Bahadur Shah, named after Lakhnauti of Gaur
 Lucknow, of which the original name was Lakhnauti (of Awadh), then Lakhnau (now spelled Lucknow)